Sir William Strath, KCB (16 November 1906 – 8 May 1975) was a Scottish civil servant and industrialist. Educated at the University of Glasgow, he entered the civil service in 1929 as an official in the Inland Revenue; he moved to the Air Ministry in 1938 and then the Ministry of Aircraft Production in 1940. His post-war career included spells at the Ministry of Supply and HM Treasury. He sat on the UK Atomic Energy Authority from 1955 to 1959 and then served as Permanent Secretary of the Ministry of Supply in 1959 and the Ministry of Aviation from 1959 to 1960. In 1961, he became Group Managing Director of Tube Investments, serving until 1972; he was also Chairman of the British Aluminium Company from 1962 to 1972.

References 

1906 births
1975 deaths
Scottish civil servants
Scottish industrialists
Alumni of the University of Glasgow
Knights Companion of the Order of the Bath
Civil servants in the Ministry of Aircraft Production